Concord is a census-designated place comprising the main settlement in the town of Concord, Essex County, Vermont, United States. As of the 2010 census, it had a population of 271, out of a total town population of 1,235.

The Concord CDP is in the western part of the town of Concord, along the Moose River, a west-flowing tributary of the Passumpsic River and part of the Connecticut River basin. U.S. Route 2 passes through the center of the CDP, leading west  to St. Johnsbury and east  to Lancaster, New Hampshire.

References

Census-designated places in Vermont
Census-designated places in Essex County, Vermont